Muddy Run is a  long 2nd order tributary to Georges Creek in Fayette County, Pennsylvania.

Course
Muddy Run rises about 0.25 miles east of Oliphant Furnace, Pennsylvania, and then flows west and south to join Georges Creek at Fairchance, Pennsylvania.

Watershed
Muddy Run drains  of area, receives about 44.2 in/year of precipitation, has a wetness index of 410.02, and is about 36% forested.

See also
List of rivers of Pennsylvania

References

Rivers of Pennsylvania
Rivers of Fayette County, Pennsylvania
Allegheny Plateau